Quran 113, "The Daybreak", (al-falaq)
Q113, New York bus route